Dismal Island is an island,  long and  high, which is mainly ice covered and is the largest of the Faure Islands, lying in Marguerite Bay off the west coast of Graham Land. The Faure Islands were discovered and first charted in 1909 by the French Antarctic Expedition under Jean-Baptiste Charcot. The group was visited and surveyed in 1949 by the Falkland Islands Dependencies Survey, who so named this island for its appearance of extreme desolation and lifelessness.

See also 
 List of Antarctic and sub-Antarctic islands

References 

Islands of Graham Land
Fallières Coast